The Limassol derby refers to Limassol's local derby, football matches played between any two of AEL, Apollon or Aris, all played at Tsirion Stadium. It is widely regarded as one of the fiercest football rivalries in Cyprus due to continuous fights and riots amongst the teams' fans.

The main derby is between Apollon and AEL, due to the big number of supporters the clubs have, to the titles that both clubs have won in the past and to the historical and ideological rivalry between the two clubs.

Background

The rivalry is most intense in matches involving AEL and Apollon as they historically play in the same division. The rivalry as a whole, however, had formed mostly due to all teams sharing the same home stadium, although recent league competitiveness also played an important role in its formation.

Records and statistics

Summary

Statistics by competition

Apollon-AEL

Apollon-Aris

Source: World FootballLast updated: 15 March 2015

AEL-Aris

Source: World FootballLast updated: 15 March 2015

Results
"Domestic League" results only refer to matches played within the first phase of the season and do not include any after season play-off matches

Apollon-AEL

Domestic league
Note: list only includes last ten matches

Source: World FootballLast updated: 15 March 2015

Other competitions
Note: list only includes last ten matches

Source: World FootballLast updated: 15 March 2015

Apollon-Aris

Domestic league
Note: list only includes last ten matches

Source: World FootballLast updated: 15 March 2015

Other competitions
Note: list only includes last ten matches

Source: World FootballLast updated: 15 March 2015

AEL-Aris

Domestic league
Note: list only includes last ten matches

Source: World FootballLast updated: 15 March 2015

Other competitions
Note: list only includes last ten matches

Source: World FootballLast updated: 15 March 2015

Notes:
1 Won after extra time.

See also
Sports Rivalry
Local derby
List of association football rivalries in Europe

References

Football in Cyprus
AEL Limassol
Apollon Limassol FC
Aris Limassol FC
Football derbies in Cyprus